Béla Miklós de Dálnok, Vitéz of Dálnok (11 June 1890 – 21 November 1948) was a Hungarian military officer and politician who served as acting Prime Minister of Hungary, at first in opposition, and then officially, from 1944 to 1945. He was the last Prime Minister of war-time Hungary.

Biography

Early career
Béla Miklós was born into a Székely primipilus family in Budapest on 11 June 1890. His parents were Gergely Miklós de Dálnok and Janka Traviczky. Miklós used the title of dálnoki after Dálnok, Transylvania (today Dalnic, part of Romania), where his father worked as a teacher. Béla Miklós married Éva Csákány.

He finished secondary studies at the Honvéd Principal Gymnasium of Sopron in 1907. After graduating from Ludovica Military Academy in 1910, he was promoted to Hussar Lieutenant. He participated in the First World War. Returning home, he became a member of the Sopron military command. He graduated from General Staff College between 1920 and 1921, after that he worked in the Ministry of Defence. He was awarded Order of Vitéz by Regent Miklós Horthy in 1929. In that same year he became Deputy Chief of the Regent's Military Office.

Miklós was briefly chief of military intelligence until he was appointed military attaché to Berlin and Stockholm between 1933 and 1936, eventually coming to lead his own regiment. After rising from regimental to corps command, he became military director of the office of Admiral Miklós Horthy, regent of Hungary, in October 1942. He was promoted to Colonel General in 1943.

Late World War II
Miklós became commanding general of the Hungarian First Army from 1 August 1944 and he supported leaving the Axis powers and joining the Red Army. On 16 October 1944, Miklós was ordered to appear at the headquarters of German General Heinrici. Suspicious of an eventual arrest, he defected through the Hungarian front with one of his aides and two sergeants. He approached the Soviet forces. After some apprehension, they escorted Miklós to Lisko, near Przemyśl. This was the location of the Soviet general headquarters.

Miklós arrived at Lisko on the morning of 17 October. Per the request of the Soviets, he spoke on the radio and made a plea for the commanding officers of his Hungarian First Army to defect with their units to the Soviets.

The Soviets re-armed prisoners of war and planned to form a Hungarian liberation army from the defectors. But, with the exception of one regimental commander, no other Hungarian officer defected in response to Miklós's plea. The one regimental commander who did defect was arrested by the Germans and immediately executed.

A few days later Soviet emissaries were sent to negotiate with Miklós about the formation of a Hungarian counter-Government. These negotiations came to nothing.

Interim government
On 21 December 1944 the Interim Assembly met in Debrecen. Representatives were present from the Communist, Smallholders, Social Democratic, Peasant Party and Citizen's party. The Assembly elected the interim government, with Soviet approval, which was headed by Miklós. He remained in this post until the coming elections on 15 November 1945. The High National Council, which functioned as a collective head of state, formed on 26 January 1945 under the presidency of Béla Zsedényi. Miklós as incumbent Prime Minister also became a member of the body. During his premiership, the arrest of war criminals and confiscations had begun, pro-German organizations and political parties were dissolved, and the new regime removed the "reactionary elements" from public institutions and the Hungarian army. The Provisional National Government established the people's tribunes. Miklós disbanded the Military Order of Maria Theresa with a decree in the summer of 1945. Béla Miklós could not prevent the deportation of hundreds of thousands to the Soviet Union. Following the 1945 Hungarian parliamentary election, he was replaced by Zoltán Tildy.

Later career
In July 1947 he became a founding member of the Hungarian Independence Party (MFP: Magyar Függetlenségi Párt), a split from the Independent Smallholders, Agrarian Workers and Civic Party. In the semi-free 1947 Hungarian parliamentary election, he won a seat for the party. However, all mandates of the Independence Party, which was defamed as “fascist”, were canceled in November 1947 under pressure from the Communist Hungarian Working People's Party. After that, Miklós withdrew from public life. 

He died one year later and was buried without military honour.

References

Further reading
 Borhi, László. Hungary in the Cold War, 1945-1956: Between the United States and the Soviet Union ( Central European university press, 2004).
 Kenez, Peter. Hungary from the Nazis to the Soviets: the Establishment of the Communist Regime in Hungary, 1944-1948 (Cambridge University Press, 2006).

External links
 Magyar Életrajzi Lexikon
 Library of Szeged

1890 births
1948 deaths
Politicians from Budapest
People from the Kingdom of Hungary
Nobility from Budapest
Hungarian Independence Party politicians
Prime Ministers of Hungary
Members of the National Assembly of Hungary (1945–1947)
Members of the National Assembly of Hungary (1947–1949)
World War II political leaders
Hungarian generals
Austro-Hungarian military personnel of World War I
Hungarian military personnel of World War II
Recipients of the Knight's Cross of the Iron Cross
Military personnel from Budapest